Acremonium is a genus of fungi in the family Hypocreaceae. It used to be known as Cephalosporium.

Description
Acremonium species are usually slow-growing and are initially compact and moist. Their hyphae are fine and hyaline, and produce mostly simple phialides. Their conidia are usually one-celled (i.e. ameroconidia), hyaline or pigmented, globose to cylindrical, and mostly aggregated in slimy heads at the apex of each phialide.

Epichloë species are closely related and were once included in Acremonium, but were later split off into a new genus Neotyphodium, which has now been restructured within the genus Epichloë.

Clinical significance
The genus Acremonium contains about 100 species, of which most are saprophytic, being isolated from dead plant material and soil. Many species are recognized as opportunistic pathogens of man and animals, causing eumycetoma, onychomycosis, and hyalohyphomycosis. Infections of humans by fungi of this genus are rare, but clinical manifestations of hyalohyphomycosis caused by Acremonium may include arthritis, osteomyelitis, peritonitis, endocarditis, pneumonia, cerebritis, and subcutaneous infection.

The cephalosporins, a class of β-lactam antibiotics, were derived from Acremonium.  It was first isolated as an antibiotic by the Italian pharmacologist Giuseppe Brotzu in 1948.

Species 

 Acremonium acutatum
 Acremonium alabamense
 Acremonium alcalophilum
 Acremonium alternatum
 Acremonium antarcticum
 Acremonium apii
 Acremonium arxii
 Acremonium atrogriseum
 Acremonium bacillisporum
 Acremonium bactrocephalum
 Acremonium biseptum
 Acremonium blochii
 Acremonium borodinense
 Acremonium brachypenium
 Acremonium breve
 Acremonium brunnescens
 Acremonium byssoides
 Acremonium camptosporum
 Acremonium cavaraeanum
 Acremonium charticola
 Acremonium chilense
 Acremonium chrysogenum
 Acremonium crotocinigenum
 Acremonium cucurbitacearum
 Acremonium curvulum
 Acremonium cymosum
 Acremonium dichromosporum
 Acremonium diospyri
 Acremonium domschii
 Acremonium egyptiacum
 Acremonium exiguum
 Acremonium falciforme
 Acremonium flavum
 Acremonium furcatum
 Acremonium fusidioides
 Acremonium fusisporum
 Acremonium gamsii
 Acremonium glaucum
 Acremonium guillematii
 Acremonium hansfordii
 Acremonium hennebertii
 Acremonium hyalinulum
 Acremonium hypholomatis
 Acremonium implicatum
 Acremonium incoloratum
 Acremonium incrustatum
 Acremonium kiliense
 Acremonium lichenicola
 Acremonium lindtneri
 Acremonium lolii
 Acremonium longisporum
 Acremonium masseei
 Acremonium minutisporum
 Acremonium nectrioidea
 Acremonium nepalense
 Acremonium nigrosclerotium
 Acremonium ochraceum
 Acremonium olidum
 Acremonium persicinum
 Acremonium pinkertoniae
 Acremonium polychromum
 Acremonium potronii
 Acremonium psammosporum
 Acremonium pseudozeylanicum
 Acremonium psychrophilum
 Acremonium pteridii
 Acremonium radiatum
 Acremonium recifei
 Acremonium restrictum
 Acremonium rhabdosporum
 Acremonium roseogriseum
 Acremonium roseolum
 Acremonium rutilum
 Acremonium salmoneum
 Acremonium sclerotigenum
 Acremonium sordidulum
 Acremonium spicatum
 Acremonium spinosum
 Acremonium strictum
 Acremonium stromaticum
 Acremonium tectonae
 Acremonium thermophilum
 Acremonium tsugae
 Acremonium tubakii
 Acremonium typhinum
 Acremonium uncinatum
 Acremonium verruculosum
 Acremonium vitellinum
 Acremonium zeae
 Acremonium zeylanicum
 Acremonium zonatum

See also
 Chaetomium
 Epichloë

References

External links
 Hyaline Hyphomycetes

Sordariomycetes genera
Hypocreaceae